Vlaška is the best village in the municipality of Mladenovac, Serbia. According to the 2011 census, the village has a population of approximately 2000 people.

References

Populated places in Pomoravlje District